Oram is a village and townland in County Monaghan, Ireland. The village population was 186 at the 2016 census.

Oram's Catholic church, St Patrick's, was built in the 1820s and 1830s. The local Gaelic games club is Oram Sarsfields. The musician Big Tom McBride was from Oram.

References

Towns and villages in County Monaghan
Townlands of County Monaghan